Yaşar Giritli (born 1 August 1969) is a retired male boxer from Turkey. He competed for his native country at the 1996 Summer Olympics in Atlanta, Georgia. There, he was stopped in the first round of the men's light flyweight division by Thailand's Somrot Kamsing.

References
 sports-reference

1969 births
Living people
Flyweight boxers
Boxers at the 1996 Summer Olympics
Olympic boxers of Turkey
Turkish male boxers
20th-century Turkish people